Oleg Nikolayevich Samorukov (born 22 October 1972) is a Russian professional football coach and a former player who works as an assistant coach with FC Volga Tver.

Club career
As a player, he made his debut in the Soviet Second League in 1990 for FC Torpedo Ryazan. He made his Russian Football National League debut for Torpedo Ryazan on 30 May 1992 in a game against FC Sokol Saratov.

References

1972 births
Living people
Soviet footballers
Association football goalkeepers
Russian footballers
Russian football managers
FC Spartak Ryazan players